Georgia Manoli (born April 23, 1983) is a Greek former swimmer, who specialized in freestyle events. She is a single-time Olympian (2004), and a member of Olympiakos Athina. Manoli qualified for the women's 4×200 m freestyle relay, as a member of the host nation's team, at the 2004 Summer Olympics in Athens. Teaming with Zoi Dimoschaki, Marianna Lymperta, and Evangelia Tsagka in heat one, Manoli posted a split of 2:05.66 to anchor the last 50 metres of the race. She and her fellow Greeks rounded out an eight-team field to last place and fifteenth overall in a final time of 8:16.69.

References

External links
2004 Olympic Profile – Eideisis Ellinika 

1983 births
Living people
Greek female swimmers
Olympic swimmers of Greece
Swimmers at the 2004 Summer Olympics
Greek female freestyle swimmers
Swimmers from Athens